If I Had Known I Was a Genius is a film directed by Dominique Wirtschafter and written by Markus Redmond (who also stars in the film). The film premiered January 23, 2007 at the Sundance Film Festival.

Plot 
Michael (Markus Redmond) is an African-American boy with a genius I.Q. His family refuses to encourage him and tries to bring him down, and his mother (Whoopi Goldberg) nicknames him "Ugly". Michael enrolls in a high school drama class and finds encouragement from an eccentric teacher.

Cast 
Markus Redmond as Michael Reed
Whoopi Goldberg as Mrs. Reed
Keith David as Mr. Reed
Debra Wilson as Teresa Reed
Sharon Stone as Gloria Fremont
Tara Reid as Stephanie
Della Reese as Nana
Andy Richter as Game Show Host
French Stewart as Public School Principal
David Denman as Baker
Nadia Bjorlin as Faith
Julie Hagerty as Teacher

References

External links 

2007 films
American comedy-drama films
Films produced by Andrea Sperling
2007 directorial debut films
2000s English-language films
2000s American films